When the Weather Is Fine may refer to:
 When the Weather Is Fine (song), a 2005 song by Thirsty Merc
 When the Weather Is Fine (TV series), a 2020 South Korean television series